Lake Tauanui is a lake in the Northland Region of New Zealand. North of the lake is Tauanui volcanic scoria cone.

See also
List of lakes in New Zealand

References

Tauanui
Far North District